Idan is a moshav in southern Israel. Located in the Arabah valley, it falls under the jurisdiction of the Central Arava Regional Council.

History

Moshav Idan was founded in 1980 by immigrants from Canada, the United States, and South Africa, who had organized in 1976. It takes its name from the nearby Idan Stream, which was in turn named after the Arab name for the stream, Wadi al-Aidan. In 2005, it had a population of 150. After the Israel–Jordan peace treaty, some of the lands of Idan were handed over to Jordan.

Peace road

Between Idan and Hatzeva is a service road, called Peace Road. The Jewish National Fund paved the Peace Route, along the border between Israel and Jordan, for the benefit of central Arava inhabitants, following the Israel-Jordan Peace Treaty of 1994. The road runs along the foot of the Arava Cliffs, opposite the Edom Mountains, and is surrounded by agricultural fields and sandy expanses. A picnic area, lookouts and a trail have been built along the way. The road allows easy access to the eastern part of the Shezaf Nature Reserve.

References

American-Jewish culture in Israel
Canadian-Jewish culture in Israel
Moshavim
Central Arava Regional Council
Populated places in Southern District (Israel)
South African-Jewish culture in Israel
Populated places established in 1980
1980 establishments in Israel
North American-Jewish diaspora